Samuel Jordan Graham (July 27, 1859 – January 20, 1951) was a judge of the Court of Claims.

Education and career

Born in Lexington, Virginia, Graham attended Washington and Lee University and graduated from Washington and Lee University School of Law in 1881. Graham was in private practice in Lexington from 1881 to 1890, and in Pittsburgh, Pennsylvania from 1890 to 1913. He was a United States Assistant Attorney General from 1913 to 1919.

Federal judicial service

Graham was nominated by President Woodrow Wilson on July 10, 1919, to a seat on the Court of Claims (later the United States Court of Claims) vacated by Judge Samuel S. Barney. He was confirmed by the United States Senate on July 28, 1919, and received his commission the same day. He assumed senior status on May 1, 1930. His service terminated on January 20, 1951, due to his death in Roanoke, Virginia.

References

Sources
 
 

1859 births
1951 deaths
Judges of the United States Court of Claims
United States Article I federal judges appointed by Woodrow Wilson
20th-century American judges